Chisocheton granatum is a tree in the family Meliaceae. The specific epithet  is from the Latin meaning "pomegranate", referring to the shape of the fruit.

Description
The bark is pale. The flowers are creamy-white.

Distribution and habitat
Chisocheton granatum is endemic to Borneo.

References

granatum
Endemic flora of Borneo
Trees of Borneo
Plants described in 1875